The 1904 Minnesota Golden Gophers football team represented the University of Minnesota in the 1904 Western Conference football season. In their fifth year under head coach Henry L. Williams, the Golden Gophers compiled a 13–0 record (3–0 against Western Conference opponents). The 1904 Minnesota team has been recognized as a college football national champion by the Billingsley Report.

The 146 point victory over Grinnell represents both the largest point total and the largest margin of victory in Gopher football history.

Ten Minnesota players were recognized on the 1904 All-Western college football team: quarterback Sigmund Harris (COL-2, CT-2, MJ-1); halfbacks Otto Nelson Davies (COL-1, CT-2, MJ-1) and James Edward Kremer (COL-2); fullback Earl Current (CT-2, MJ-1); end Bobby Marshall (COL-2, MJ-1); tackles Percy Porter Brush (CRH, CT-2, MJ-2) and George Leland Case (MJ-2); guards Walton W. Thorpe (COL-1, CRH, CT-1, DFP, DT, MJ-1, SLR, WC) and Daniel D. Smith, Minnesota (CT-2); and center Moses Strathern (MJ-1).

Two players also received recognition on the 1904 College Football All-America Team. Quarterback Sigmund Harris received third-team honors from Walter Camp, and guard Walton Thorp received first-team honors from Illinois coach Fred Lowenthal and third-team honors from Walter Camp.

Notably, Minnesota did not play undefeated Michigan in 1904, despite the teams being members of the Western Conference. Both teams received acclaim as national champion for the 1904 season.

Schedule

References

Minnesota
Minnesota Golden Gophers football seasons
College football national champions
Big Ten Conference football champion seasons
College football undefeated seasons
Minnesota Golden Gophers football